Canadian National Railways 6077 is a preserved 4-8-2 locomotive of Canadian National Railways U-1-f class, which were nicknamed Bullet Nosed Bettys.

Construction and initial use
6077 was built in 1944 as part of order of twenty locomotives classified U-1-f. These 4-8-2 or Mountain Type locomotives were built instead of the larger more typical 4-8-4 or Northern Type. The Northern type locomotives are larger and required more steel to make and during World War II a smaller more adaptable engine for general uses were needed. The U-1-f class locomotives were built in 1944 by Montreal Locomotive Works, and were numbered between 6060 and 6079. The series of engines were nicknamed Bullet Nosed Betty for their definitive nose cone.

1945 wreck
In February 1945, a month after its first run, 6077 was involved in a fatal wreck. Approaching Brantford, Ontario, 6077 was attached to a pilot engine when, sensing that the pilot locomotive engineer did not apply the brakes for a sharp bend up ahead, hit the emergency brakes. This caused all the wheels to lock up and skid which made the train much more rigid than if it had been rolling. As a result, both locomotives derailed and drop down an embankment. The pilot engine crewmen were seriously injured but all head-end crew of 6077 were killed. The passengers on the rest of the train were not harmed because the wreck had detached the engines from the passenger cars which rolled on and came to a stop at the station.

Mechanical modifications
The locomotive was sent to Stratford, Ontario to be converted to oil fuel in September 1958. Its coal tender was replaced with that of 2-10-2 #4328. This was done to get 6077 ready for its work in western Canada where it spent the last years of its life.

Relocation and static display

Northern Ontario Railroad Museum and Prescott Park

References

6077
4-8-2 locomotives
MLW locomotives
Preserved steam locomotives of Canada
Railway locomotives introduced in 1944
Standard gauge locomotives of Canada